The Buru babirusa (Babyrousa babyrussa) is a wild pig-like animal native to the Indonesian islands of Buru, the two Sula Islands of Mangole and Taliabu. It is also known as the Moluccan babirusa, golden babirusa or hairy babirusa. Traditionally, this relatively small species included the other babirusas as subspecies, but it has been recommended treating them as separate species based on differences in their morphology. As also suggested by its alternative common names, the Buru babirusa has relatively long thick, gold-brown body-hair – a feature not shared by the other extant babirusas.

In absence of detailed data on the Buru babirusa, it is generally assumed that its habitat and ecology are similar to that of North Sulawesi babirusa (B. celebensis). Furthermore, as all babirusas were considered conspecific under the scientific name B. babyrussa until 2001, data collected before that is consistently listed under the name B. babyrussa, though the vast majority actually refers to B. celebensis (by far the best known species of babirusa). Babirusas tend to occupy tropical rainforests, river banks and various natural ponds rich in water plants. They are omnivorous and feed on various leaves, roots, fruits, invertebrates and small vertebrates. Their jaws and teeth are strong enough to crack any kind of nuts. Babirusas lack the rostral bone in their nose, which is a tool used by other wild pigs for digging. Therefore, they prefer feeding on roots in soft muddy or sandy soils. Cannibalism was reported among babirusas, feeding on the young of their own species or other mammals. North Sulawesi babirusas form groups with up to a dozen of individuals, especially when raising their young. Older males might live individually.

The north Sulawesi babirusa reach sexual maturity when they are 5–10 months old. Their estrous cycle is 28–42 days, and the gestation period lasts 150–157 days. The lifespan is about 24 years.

Hunting by the local population is another cause of concern. Whereas it is unpopular among Muslim communities for religious reasons, it is widely hunted by the indigenous people of Buru, which are predominantly Christian. The meat of the Buru babirusa has low fat (only 1.27% compared to 5–15% for domestic pigs) and is regarded as a delicacy. It is also preferred by the locals to the meat of other wild pigs or deer in terms of texture and flavor. The establishment of two protected areas on Buru, Gunung Kapalat Mada and Waeapo, partly aim at preserving the habitat of the Buru babirusa. This species also enjoys full protection under Indonesian law since 1931.

References

Suidae
Mammals of Indonesia
Mammals described in 1758
Taxa named by Carl Linnaeus
Endemic fauna of Indonesia
Fauna of the Maluku Islands
Fauna of Buru